Sandwich, also known as the Old Customs House, is a historic home located at Urbanna, Middlesex County, Virginia.  It was built about 1758, and is a three
bay rectangular plan brick structure is built into the side of a steep hill with  stories on the west up-hill facade, and  stories on the east side. The house was renovated in the 1930s. Also on the property are a contributing brick wall, and a formal boxwood garden site, which includes four contributing garden buildings. Andrew Jackson Montague purchased the property in 1934.  It is considered by many historians to be one of the oldest remaining buildings in the Urbanna Historic District.

It was listed on the National Register of Historic Places in 2008.

References

Houses on the National Register of Historic Places in Virginia
Houses completed in 1758
Houses in Middlesex County, Virginia
National Register of Historic Places in Middlesex County, Virginia
Individually listed contributing properties to historic districts on the National Register in Virginia